Chiswick School  is an English secondary school with academy status in Chiswick, West London. It educates more than 1,200 pupils, aged 11 to 18 years. This number includes 200 pupils studying at the upper school sixth form within the school grounds.

Admissions

The school has a wide catchment, encompassing its native borough of Hounslow, but also areas including Kensington and Chelsea, Richmond, and Hammersmith and Fulham. As of 2004, the school's intake was almost 60 percent male, explained by the number of girls' schools nearby. A majority of the school's students are of minority ethnic backgrounds, and a significantly greater proportion than the national average speak English as a second language. The percentage of disadvantaged students receiving help from the pupil premium is also above average.

History

Chiswick County School for Girls opened in 1916 in Burlington Lane,  and Chiswick County School for Boys opened in 1926 beside the girls' school. Rory K. Hands was appointed head of the boys school in 1963, and in 1966, he oversaw a merger of the two institutions, to form the co-educational Chiswick County Grammar School. Shortly thereafter, the Borough proposed that Hands' grammar school should be merged with two nearby secondary modern schools to form a comprehensive school, following Circular 10/65. This amalgamation created Chiswick Comprehensive School, which opened in 1968. The new school operated across two sites, with the lower school (for ages 11 to 14) occupying what had been the secondary modern school's buildings at Staveley Road, and the upper school operating on the old grammar school site at Burlington Lane.

In 1973, some of the buildings at Staveley Road had to be closed as they were made of brittle high alumina cement. The school was forced to operate with a "village of huts"; Hands maintained school morale with a production of The Gondoliers by Gilbert and Sullivan. He retired the headship in 1975 after suffering a series of heart attacks. Dame Helen Metcalf was the school's headteacher from 1988 to 2001, providing strong and emotionally intelligent leadership. Sometime after 1978 the school was renamed Chiswick Community School; the name reverted to Chiswick School when it became an academy on 1 March 2012. Today, the North Eastern block from the original girls' school still remains.

Notable former pupils

 

 John Stuart Archer – vice-chancellor of Heriot-Watt University, president of the Institution of Chemical Engineers
 Henry Badowski - musician
 Rolan Bell – actor   

 Carlton Cole – footballer
 Phil Collins – singer, songwriter and world-renowned drummer, member of rock band Genesis

 Phoebe Fox – actor

 John Neville – actor

 Nana Ofori-Twumasi – footballer

 Natalie Sawyer – TV presenter
 Kyle Simmons – keyboard player for Bastille

 Allegra Stratton – journalist, political aide

 Don Taylor – director and playwright
 Brian Tesler – chairman of London Weekend Television

References

External links
 Official site
 National Archives: minutes of the School Board 1872-1903
 Visit Gallery

Academies in the London Borough of Hounslow
Educational institutions established in 1968
Secondary schools in the London Borough of Hounslow
1968 establishments in England
Chiswick
Buildings and structures in Chiswick